William Henry Smith (7 September 1926 – December 2014) was an English professional footballer born in Plymouth, Devon, who played as a forward or wing half. He made 237 appearances and scored 40 goals in the Football League playing for Reading, Northampton Town, Birmingham City, Blackburn Rovers and Accrington Stanley.

He contributed to Blackburn's promotion to the First Division in the 1957–58 season, before moving to Accrington Stanley as player-coach in 1960. Appointed joint caretaker manager with trainer Harry Hubbick in late 1961, he retired from football when Stanley resigned from the Football League in March 1962.

References
General
 
Specific

1926 births
2014 deaths
Military personnel from Plymouth, Devon
Royal Marines ranks
Footballers from Plymouth, Devon
English footballers
Plymouth Argyle F.C. players
Reading F.C. players
Northampton Town F.C. players
Birmingham City F.C. players
Blackburn Rovers F.C. players
Accrington Stanley F.C. (1891) players
English Football League players
English football managers
Accrington Stanley F.C. (1891) managers
English Football League managers
20th-century Royal Marines personnel
Plymouth United F.C. players
Association football midfielders